Sandling railway station is on the South Eastern Main Line in England, serving the village of Sandling and the town of Hythe, Kent. It is  down the line from London Charing Cross. The station and all trains that call are operated by Southeastern.

History
The station was opened as Sandling Junction on 1 January 1888 by the South Eastern Railway (SER).

There were four platforms with a footbridge over the mainline, two signal boxes and goods sidings either side of the branch line. The goods yard was able to accommodate most types of goods including live stock.

The up branch platform was closed when the line to Sandgate was cut back to Hythe and the branch line singled in 1931. 

The station was host to a Southern Railway camping coach in 1939.

The branch line to Hythe was closed on 3 December 1951 and the down branch platform was closed. At the same time the station was renamed Sandling for Hythe. 

A camping coach was also positioned here by the Southern Region from 1954 to 1959, the coach was replaced in 1960 by two Pullman camping coaches until 1964 then from 1965 to 1967 there were three of them. The coaches were fitted with a full kitchen, two sleeping compartments and a room with two single beds.

On 12 May 1980 the station was renamed as Sandling. 

It is the closest station to Saltwood Castle (where Alan Clark lived until his death) and it is frequently mentioned in the Alan Clark Diaries.

In 2022 the disused branch platform is still in situ and a short section of the Hythe branch is available as a footpath.

Facilities
The station has a ticket office which is staffed during weekday mornings only (06:20-13:00 Mon-Fri). At other times, the station is unstaffed and tickets must be purchased from the self-service ticket machine. The station has passenger help points located on each  of the two platforms.

The station has a small cycle rack as well as a chargeable car park at the entrance, operated by Saba Parking.

The station has step-free access available to the platforms although the Dover bound platform can only be reached from the station building via the footbridge meaning step-free access is not possible if ticket facilities are required as there is no ticket machine on the Dover platform.

Services
All services at Sandling are operated by Southeastern using Class 375 EMUs.

The typical off-peak service in trains per hour is:
 1 tph to London Charing Cross via 
 1 tph to 

Bus Connections
The station is served by the following bus routes, all operated by Stagecoach South East:
 10/10A to Ashford and Folkestone
 18 to Canterbury and Hythe

References

External links

Transport in Folkestone and Hythe
Railway stations in Kent
DfT Category E stations
Former South Eastern Railway (UK) stations
Railway stations in Great Britain opened in 1888
Railway stations served by Southeastern
1888 establishments in England